Della is a female given name, a variant of Adela.  Notable people with the name include:

Given name 
 Della Au Belatti (born 1974), Democratic member of the Hawaii House of Representatives
 Della Davidson (1951–2012), American modern dancer and choreographer
 Della Ding (born 1982), or Ding Dang, Chinese pop singer
 Della Hann, American psychologist and research administrator
 Della Jones (born 1946), Welsh opera and concert mezzo-soprano singer
 Della Campbell MacLeod (ca. 1884 – ?), American author and journalist
 Della Moore (c. 1880–1926), American prostitute
 Della Purves (1945–2008), British botanical artist
 Della Reese (1931–2017), American jazz and gospel singer, and actress
 Della Sehorn (1927–2001), competitive breaststroke swimmer
 Della Woods (born 1940), dragster driver

Fictional characters 
 Della Alexander, a character in the soap opera EastEnders
 Della Duck, twin sister of Donald Duck and mother of Huey, Dewey, and Louie
 Della Street, the secretary of Perry Mason
 Della Vacker, a character in the book series "Keeper of the Lost Cities" by Shannon Messenger
 Adaline “Della” Bowman, from the movie “Age of Adaline” with Blake Lively

Surname 
 George W. Della Jr. (born 1943), American politician

Surname component 
 Piero della Francesca (c. 1415 – 1492), Italian Renaissance painter
 Della Gherardesca family of the republic of Pisa
 Ivan Della Mea (1940–2009), Italian actor, writer and singer
 Giovanni Pico della Mirandola (1463–1494) Italian nobleman and philosopher
 Giambattista della Porta (1535–1615) Neapolitan polymath
 Della Rovere, Italian noble family
 Della Scala, the Scaliger Veronese noble family
 Della Torre or Torriani, Lombard noble family